dérive – Zeitschrift für Stadtforschung is an Austrian science magazine on urbanism.

History and profile
dérive is published quarterly since 2000 by the Vienna based Verein für Stadtforschung.

The journal publishes articles from a broad range of urbanism disciplines such as architecture, urban and land-use planning, art, geography, sociology, or philosophy. Articles from urban sociology include contributions from Loïc Wacquant and Saskia Sassen.

Name 
Dérive is a concept of psychogeography that includes unplanned journeys through urban space. The individual travels where the subtle aesthetic contours of the surrounding architecture and geography subconsciously direct them, with the ultimate goal of encountering an entirely new and authentic experience.

Networks 
The magazine is part of the European network of cultural magazines Eurozine.

Urbanize
The journal also hosts the annual festival urbanize on urban issues.

See also
 List of magazines in Austria

References

External links

2000 establishments in Austria
Design magazines
German-language magazines
Magazines established in 2000
Magazines published in Vienna
Quarterly magazines
Science and technology magazines